Paul Vachon (born October 7, 1937) is a Canadian retired professional wrestler. He is a member of the Vachon wrestling family. He is perhaps best known by his ring name Butcher Vachon.

Professional wrestling career
Paul Vachon grew up as one of thirteen children of Ferdinand Vachon, a Montreal police officer. In 1957, he followed his brother Maurice into professional business, adopting his brother's, the "Mad Dog", vicious heel style and the moniker "Butcher Vachon". He wrestled in the American Wrestling Association, World Wrestling Federation (now WWE), National Wrestling Alliance and Georgia Championship Wrestling (later would become WCW).

He often teamed with his brother "Mad Dog" Vachon, with whom he won the AWA World Tag Team Championship.

In the early 1970s he appeared alongside his sister Vivian Vachon in the motion picture Wrestling Queen.

He wrestled under a mask as "Spoiler #2" for Jim Crockett Promotions' "Mid-Atlantic Championship Wrestling" in 1975. His angle involved getting revenge on Wahoo McDaniel, Paul Jones, and Rufus R. Jones for running Super Destroyer (Don Jardine) out of the territory. (In fact, Jardine left JCP on short notice and booker George Scott wanted a masked heel on the roster.) Vachon stayed in JCP for a few months and before leaving lost a series of matches against Paul Jones and Rufus Jones in which the mask was at stake (as was Paul Jones' U.S. title in their matches).

Paul retired in 1985. Proving his talents extend beyond the wrestling ring, one of his final appearances was singing "La Vie en Rose" on Tuesday Night Titans.

Personal life
He was the adoptive father of wrestler Luna Vachon. He is the brother of wrestlers Maurice and Vivian Vachon and former father-in-law of wrestlers David "Gangrel" Heath and Tom Nash. In total, Vachon has six children and has been married four times.

After his wrestling career, Paul Vachon joined the NDP and ran as a federal candidate in 1988, 1993 and 1995.

In 1993, he was diagnosed with colon cancer and had half of his colon removed. Then, in 2003, he was diagnosed with throat cancer. Vachon underwent 40 treatments, one on each weekday for five straight weeks, to overcome the throat cancer. In addition, he had the disease burned out of his tonsils and his teeth were removed. As a result of the radiation treatments, he underwent reconstructive jaw surgery in early June 2009. Vachon also suffers from diabetes.

Vachon and his wife Rebecca travel to flea markets and fairs to sell therapeutic magnets, a business they began in 1995. He also self-published an autobiography titled When Wrestling Was Real.

Championships and accomplishments
50th State Big Time Wrestling
NWA Hawaii Tag Team Championship (1 time) - with Hard Boiled Haggerty
American Wrestling Association
AWA Midwest Tag Team Championship (1 time) - with Maurice Vachon
AWA World Tag Team Championship (1 time) - with Maurice Vachon
Cauliflower Alley Club
Men’s Wrestling Award (2008)
Eastern Townships Wrestling Association
ETWA Heavyweight Championship (1 time)
George Tragos/Lou Thesz Professional Wrestling Hall of Fame
Class of 2010
Mid-Atlantic Championship Wrestling
NWA Southern Tag Team Championship (Mid-Atlantic version) (1 time) - with Maurice Vachon
Mid-South Sports
NWA Georgia Tag Team Championship (1 time) - with Stan Vachon
NWA Southern Tag Team Championship (Georgia version) (5 times) - with Louie Tillet (2) and Stan Vachon (3)
NWA World Tag Team Championship (Georgia version) (1 time) - with Maurice Vachon
NWA Hollywood Wrestling
NWA Americas Tag Team Championship (1 time) - with Chavo Guerrero Sr.
Professional Wrestling Hall of Fame and Museum
(Class of 2004) - with Maurice Vachon
Southwest Sports, Inc.
NWA Texas Tag Team Championship (2 times) - with Maurice Vachon (1) and Ivan the Terrible (1)
Stampede Wrestling
NWA Canadian Tag Team Championship (Calgary version) (3 times) - with Maurice Vachon
NWA International Tag Team Championship (Calgary version) (3 times) - with Maurice Vachon

Electoral record (incomplete)

References

Further reading

External links

1937 births
Canadian male professional wrestlers
Canadian sportsperson-politicians
Living people
New Democratic Party candidates for the Canadian House of Commons
Professional Wrestling Hall of Fame and Museum
Quebec candidates for Member of Parliament
Stampede Wrestling alumni
Vachon family
20th-century professional wrestlers
AWA World Tag Team Champions
Professional wrestlers from Montreal
NWA Canadian Tag Team Champions (Calgary version)
Stampede Wrestling International Tag Team Champions
NWA Americas Tag Team Champions
NWA Georgia Tag Team Champions